Hamza Adam (born 30 October 1975) is a Ghanaian politician and member of the National Democratic Congress. He is the member of parliament for Kumbungu Constituency in the Northern Region.

Early life and education 
Adam was born on October 30, 1975. He holds a PhD in Rural Livelihoods, an MPhil in Agricultural Extension, and a BSc in Agriculture Technology.

Career 
Adam has worked as a lecturer and a Head of Department at the University for Development Studies.

Politics 
At the 2020 parliamentary elections, Adam polled 24,278 votes to win the seat for Kumbungu Constituency.

Personal life 
He is Muslim.

References 

1975 births
Living people
Ghanaian MPs 2021–2025
Academic staff of the University for Development Studies